Nilland is a serif typeface designed by Manfred Klein. It is primarily intended for headers, not body text.

Variants
There are five main variants of Nilland:
 Nilland-Black
 Nilland-Bold
 Nilland-ExtraBold
 Nilland-SmallCaps
 Nilland-SmallCaps-Bold

Unicode ranges
Nilland contains support for characters in 9 different Unicode ranges:
 Basic Latin
 Latin-1 Supplement
 Latin Extended-A
 Latin Extended-B
 Spacing Modifier Letters
 General Punctuation
 Letterlike Symbols
 Mathematical Operators
 Private Use Area

References

External links
 https://www.dafont.com/nilland.font
Slab serif typefaces
Display typefaces